Gober C. Sosebee (October 15, 1915 – November 11, 1996) was an American racecar driver. He won on the Daytona Beach Road Course in 1949, 1950, and 1951.  He was born in Dawson County, Georgia, and began his career in 1940 at Atlanta's Lakewood Speedway.

Sosebee also won two Grand National Series races, one in 1952 and another in 1954. He also had four pole positions (including his first NASCAR race at Daytona Beach) and 33 top-10 finishes during his career, and also ran five races in the NASCAR Convertible Division.

His son, David Sosebee, was also a NASCAR driver.

Motorsports career results

NASCAR
(key) (Bold – Pole position awarded by qualifying time. Italics – Pole position earned by points standings or practice time. * – Most laps led.)

Grand National Series

Daytona 500

References

External links
 
 

1915 births
1996 deaths
People from Dawsonville, Georgia
Sportspeople from the Atlanta metropolitan area
Racing drivers from Georgia (U.S. state)
NASCAR drivers